Henry IV is a 1984 Italian drama film directed by Marco Bellocchio. It is based on the Luigi Pirandello play of the same name and has music by Astor Piazzolla.  It was entered into the 1984 Cannes Film Festival.

Cast
 Marcello Mastroianni as Henry IV
 Claudia Cardinale as Matilda
 Leopoldo Trieste as Psychiatrist
 Paolo Bonacelli as Belcredi
 Gianfelice Imparato
 Claudio Spadaro
 Giuseppe Cederna
 Giacomo Bertozzi
 Fabrizio Macciantelli
 Luciano Bartoli as young Henry IV
 Latou Chardons as young Matilda / Frida

References

External links

1984 films
1984 drama films
Italian drama films
1980s Italian-language films
Films based on works by Luigi Pirandello
Films directed by Marco Bellocchio
Films with screenplays by Tonino Guerra
Films about amnesia
Italian films based on plays
1980s Italian films